Revista Portuguesa de Estomatologia e Cirurgia Maxilo-facial (Portuguese Journal of Stomatology and Maxillofacial Surgery) is a discontinued journal of stomatology and maxillofacial surgery. The last issue was volume 57, number 4 for October-December 2016. It was indexed in Scopus.

References 

Dentistry journals
Publications disestablished in 2016
Defunct journals
Portuguese-language journals
Dentistry in Portugal